Domingo García may refer to:

 Domingo García, Segovia, a municipality in the province of Segovia, Spain
 Domingo García (footballer) (1904–?), Peruvian football midfielder
 Domingo García (fencer) (1895–?), Spanish fencer
 Domingo García (politician), Texas politician
 Saint Dominic de la Calzada (1019–1109), born Domingo García
 Domingo García Ramos (1911–1978), Mexican architect

Garcia, Domingo